Saint-Loup-de-Gonois is a former commune in the Loiret department in north-central France. On 1 March 2019, it was merged into the commune La Selle-sur-le-Bied.

See also
Communes of the Loiret department

References

Saintloupdegonois